Heribert Barrera i Costa (6 July 1917 – 27 August 2011) was a Spanish chemist and politician from Catalonia, member of Republican Left of Catalonia and first president of the restored Parliament of Catalonia after Francoism, from 1980 until 1984. He was the son of Martí Barrera.

He died in Barcelona on 27 August 2011 aged 94.

References

1917 births
2011 deaths
Scientists from Catalonia
General Secretaries of the Republican Left of Catalonia
Members of the Institute for Catalan Studies
MEPs for Spain 1989–1994
People from Barcelona
Presidents of the Parliament of Catalonia
Presidents of the Republican Left of Catalonia
Republican Left of Catalonia politicians
Spanish chemists